Zenostephanus is true ammonite genus from the lower part of the Upper Jurassic of eastern England and Scotland belonging to the ammonitid family, Perisphinctidae.

Zenostephanus is revised from Xenostephanus, a  preoccupied name for a new genus of toxodont notoungulate from Argentina.  The type is Aulacostephanus ranbyensis

References

 Perisphinctidae in the Treatise on Invertebrate Paleontology,  Part L, Mollusca 4.

Ammonitida genera
Perisphinctidae